The Sestra (or) is a river in Vsevolozhsky and Vyborgsky Districts of Leningrad Oblast and Kurortny District of Saint Petersburg, Russia.

The Sestra flows over the Karelian Isthmus. The source of the river is in swamps west of the settlement of Vaskelovo, and the Sestra flows in the general direction south, having its mouth in the town of Sestroretsk. It used to fall into the Gulf of Finland until the early 18th century. Since then, the Sestra River has been flowing into this reservoir. The Sestroretsk Overflow is separated from the Gulf of Finland with a ridge of artificial sand dunes.

The Sestra served as a natural border between Russia and Sweden (1323–1617) and between Russia and Finland (1812–1940). It currently serves as a border between Vsevolozhsky (east, formerly Soviet Union) and Vyborgsky (west, formerly Finland) districts of Leningrad Oblast.

References

Karelian Isthmus
Geography of Karelia
Rivers of Leningrad Oblast
Rivers of Saint Petersburg
Drainage basins of the Baltic Sea